Peter Bankole (born 7 September 1981) is a UK based film, television and stage actor.

Early life
Bankole was born in King's Norton on 7 September 1981.

Career
In film he has appeared in The Duchess of Malfi in 2010, Red Faction: Origins in 2011, The Physician in 2013 and Danny and the Human Zoo in 2015. In television he has appeared in Casualty, The Rotters' Club, The Bill, Death in Paradise, and Clique.

Film
Bankole played the part of Ezra in the  2011 sci-fi film Red Faction: Origins which was directed by Michael Nankin. He appeared in the Philipp Stölzl directed The Physician which was released in 2013. He played the part of Mano Dayak. He played the part of Larrington in the Destiny Ekaragha directed film, Danny and the Human Zoo, which was a fictionalized account of Lenny Henry's teenage years spent in Dudley in the 1970s.

Television
One of his earliest roles was in Casualty, as Chris Barclay in the episode Don't Go There, which was broadcast on 23 May 2004. He played the role of Steve Richards in The Rotters' Club which began on BBC TWO on 26 January 2005. His role as Richards, the only black kid in school was newcomer and high achiever. The series was set when there was a time of social change and racial tension in the 1970s. In Season 3, Episode 2 of Death in Paradise which was about a murder on a film set, he played the part of Big Dave. The episode was broadcast on 21 January 2014.

Stage
In  The Caucasian Chalk Circle, which played at the Unicorn Theater in 2009, he played Simon, a soldier who was proud of his promotion and pay rise, and who wanted to settle down and start a family. To research the role he watched a lot of war films, read books on the subject as well as internet research. In Fences which was playing at Milton Keynes Theatre in 2013, he played the part of Lyons the musician son of Troy Maxson (played by Lenny Henry) who is not impressed with some aspects of his son's musicianship. In her review for The Birmingham Post reviewer Melissa Henry described Bankole's performance as touching, raising the game higher, providing a wonderful evening. In Rachel De-lahay’s Routes which was a follow up to her successful play Westbridge, Bankole was noted for his giving life to the character Olufemi, a Nigerian who uses a false identity in his home country so he can join his wife and children in London.<ref>The Guardian, Fri 27 Sep ‘13 - Routes – review Michael Billington</ref> He appeared in Bijan Sheibani's The Barber Shop Chronicles which played at Londons National Theatre in 2017. Reviewer Maryam Philpott for The Reviews Hub'' noted his performance.

Filmography

References

External links

Living people
English male film actors
English male television actors
Black British male actors
English male stage actors
English people of Nigerian descent
1981 births